Edward William Burns (2 February 1889 – 2 July 1972) was an Australian rules footballer who played with St Kilda in the Victorian Football League (VFL).

Notes

External links 

1889 births
1972 deaths
Australian rules footballers from Victoria (Australia)
St Kilda Football Club players
Shepparton Football Club players
People from Shepparton